Glencoe is a rural locality in the Toowoomba Region, Queensland, Australia. In the ,Glencoe had a population of 322 people.

The area was once known as Gowrie Scrub.

Geography 

History 

The Bethlehem Lutheran Church opened in 1880 and celebrated its 125th anniversary in 2005.

Glencoe State School opened circa 1882 and closed circa 1941. It was at 62 Glencoe Yalangur Road.

On Sunday 29 July 1900, Bishop William Webber officially opened St Jude's Church of England. It was on a  site on the slope of Glencoe Mountain (now called Storey). It was at 341 Glencoe Yalangur Road.

The first burial in Glencoe general cemetery was in 25 October 2004.

Education
There are no schools in Glencoe. The nearest government primary schools are Kingsthorpe State School in neighbouring Kingsthorpe to the south-west, Meringandan State School in neighbouring Meringandan West to the north-east, and Gowrie State School in neighbouring Gowrie Junction to the south-east. The nearest government secondary schools are Highfields State High School in Highfields to the east, Oakey State High School in Oakey to the west, and Wilsonton State High School in Wilsonton Heights to the south-east.

Amenities

Glencoe Lutheran Church (formerly Bethlehem Lutheran Church) is at 317 Gowrie Glencoe Road.

Two cemeteries are located adjacent to one another in Glencoe Road. One is associated with the neighbouring Lutheran Church. the other is a non-denominational lawn cemetery operated by the Toowoomba Regional Council.

References

External links

Toowoomba Region

Localities in Queensland